Leckhampstead is a village and civil parish in the unitary authority area of Buckinghamshire, England. The village is on the River Leck, a tributary of the River Great Ouse.

History
The toponym is derived from the Old English for "homestead where leeks are grown". In the Domesday Book of 1086 the village was recorded as Lechamstede.

In the middle of the 16th century the village was split into two halves, Leckhampstead Magna and Leckhampstead Parva, with the foundation of a manor house in the latter. However within a couple of centuries the two halves were joined up again when the incumbent of Leckhampstead Magna inherited Leckhampstead Parva.

The manor and living of Leckhampstead were given to Martha Lovelace who was the daughter of the Governor of New York. She married Henry Beauclerk and their only son, also called Henry, inherited the manor in 1788. This Henry had already been given the living of the parish church of the Assumption of the Blesséd Virgin Mary.

The church building is Norman, with a tower that was added in the 13th century. It is a Grade I listed building.

References

Works cited

Further reading

External links

 North Buckingham Parish

Villages in Buckinghamshire
Civil parishes in Buckinghamshire